Sendle is an Australian-based company which provides courier services within the country, focusing primarily on small to medium-sized businesses and online retailers. It claims to be the first courier company in Australia to offer fully carbon neutral services. While its delivery services are worldwide - with the exception of Russia and Belarus - its operational staff are based in Australia, New Zealand, the Philippines and the United States.

History
The company was founded in 2014 by James Bradfield Moody, Sean Geoghegan and Craig Davis. In 2015, Sendle said that it had become Australia's first carbon neutral delivery service.

In 2015, Australia Post filed a trademark dispute against Sendle for their slogan “Post without the office”. In 2017, IP Australia ruled in Sendle’s favour, allowing them to use the trademark and slogan.

In August 2016, Sendle said that it had surpassed 100 million kilometres in its deliveries and that it had raised $5 million for further expansion. The company won the 2016 NSW Telstra Business Award in the new business category.

In 2017, Sendle announced an agreement with DHL eCommerce to facilitate international deliveries from Australia, and a systems integration with e-commerce companies eBay, Shopify, Shipstation, WooCommerce and Xero to streamline order handling. In 2018, the company said that it was partnering with eBay and had become one of their delivery partners.

In 2019, Sendle raised $20 million in capital, and in 2021, a further $35 million.

References

External links 
 Official website

Australian companies established in 2014
Companies based in Sydney
Logistics companies of Australia
B Lab-certified corporations in Australia